John Lawless may refer to:
John Lawless (ice hockey) (born 1961), Canadian ice hockey player
John A. Lawless, former member of the Pennsylvania House of Representatives
John Lawless, fictional Irish character from the 1967 Walt Disney musical film The Happiest Millionaire

pt:Fray (desambiguação)